Crucial Instances is a 1901 short story collection by Edith Wharton.

The book contains a collection of seven stories:

 "The Duchess at Prayer"
 "The Angel at the Grave"
 "The Recovery"
 "Copy: A Dialogue"
 "The Rembrandt"
 "The Moving Finger"
 "The Confessional"

The story The Duchess at Prayer is a rewriting of Honoré de Balzac's short story La Grande Bretèche (1831).

References

External links
 
The full text of Crucial Instances at Project Gutenberg
Read Crucial Instances over email at DailyReader.net
Google books information on Crucial Instances at Google Books
 

Short stories by Edith Wharton
American short story collections
1901 short story collections